Harry & Lena is a 1970 studio album issued by RCA Records by Harry Belafonte and Lena Horne. In 1970 Belafonte Enterprises Production, recorded a television special for ABC featuring Harry Belafonte and Lena Horne as double billed artists. The hour special titled Harry & Lena, For The Love Of Life first aired on March 22, 1970, featuring solo and duet performances. Later in year the main sponsor of the show, Fabergé, made this studio recording of songs featured and performed in the television special available as a limited edition collectors item.
The album was originally available only by  mail order and not sold in record stores.

Track listing
"Walk a Mile in My Shoes" (Joe South) Duet Harry Belafonte and Lena Horne
"My Old Man" (Jerry Jeff Walker) Harry Belafonte
"It's Always Somewhere Else" (Jake Holmes) Lena Horne
"In My Life" (John Lennon, Paul McCartney) Lena Horne
"The Ghetto" (Homer Banks, Bettye Crutcher, Bonnie Bramlett) Harry Belafonte
"Brown Baby" (Oscar Brown, Jr.) Lena Horne
"Down on the Corner" (John Fogerty) Harry Belafonte
"Subway to the Country" (David Ackles) Harry Belafonte
"Measure the Valleys" (Robert Brittan, Judd Woldin) Lena Horne
"Love Story (You and Me)" (Randy Newman) Duet Harry Belafonte and Lena Horne
"I Want to Be Happy" (Vincent Youmans, Irving Caesar) Lena Horne
"The First Time Ever" (Ewan MacColl) Duet Harry Belafonte and Lena Horne
"Don't It Make You Wanna Go Home" (South) Duet Harry Belafonte and Lena Horne
"Abraham, Martin and John" (Dick Holler) Harry Belafonte

Personnel
Bob Freedman - arranger, conductor
William Eaton
Performance
Harry Belafonte - vocals
Lena Horne

References

1970 albums
Collaborative albums
Harry Belafonte albums
Lena Horne albums
Vocal duet albums
RCA Records albums